Poss may refer to:
 National Geographic Society – Palomar Observatory Sky Survey, a major photographic survey of the night sky
 Professional open-source software
 Polyhedral oligomeric silsesquioxane, an organic-inorganic hybrid compound with inorganic cubic core and outer organic groups.
 Post Open Source software

People
 Barry Poss, co-founder of Sugar Hill Records
 Greg Poss (b. 1965), former American hockey player and current coach
 Nadine Poss (b. 1991), the 2013/14 German Wine Queen
 Reinhold Poss (1897–1933), German flying ace and racing pilot
 Robert Poss, an American guitarist and music producer

See also
 Posse (disambiguation)
 Possessive (disambiguation)
 Possibility (disambiguation)